David Crawford Lochary (August 21, 1944 – July 29, 1977) was an American actor, one of the regular "Dreamlander" actors in early films of the controversial "trash" film director John Waters. He starred in such films as Pink Flamingos, Female Trouble, and Multiple Maniacs, in which he typically played exotically-dressed, sophisticated perverts. Lochary co-wrote The Diane Linkletter Story with Divine, and worked as an uncredited hair and makeup artist on many of Waters' films. Lochary met Divine at beauty school and used to style his wigs and makeup for parties. Divine later commented that he had "never even heard the word 'drag' before David."

Personal life 
Lochary was the son of Dean and Mary Eileen (nee McMahan) Lochary; his mother Mary was featured on two of Waters' films: Multiple Maniacs and Female Trouble. Donald Lochary, David's elder brother, died in July 2019; he also played a small, uncredited role on Female Trouble.

Lochary was gay; in the 70s, he dated singer John Condon.

According to Robert Maier, Lochary moved from Baltimore to New York in the 70s in order to become more famous. After failing to become commercially successful, he then started to struggle with addiction; by the time of his death, he was "far gone on substances".

Lochary has developed a cult following throughout the years, including fan-clubs.

In 1977, Lochary died while intoxicated on PCP. Under said influence, he felt no pain. So, he cut himself with a mirror and bled to death.

Filmography
Roman Candles (1966) as Boyfriend of the Governess
Eat Your Makeup (1968) as Governess' boyfriend
Mondo Trasho (1969) as Asylum Inmate/Dr. Coathanger/Voice of Snob #2 (also: makeup artist for Divine/production assistant, uncredited)
The Diane Linkletter Story (1970) as Art Linkletter (also: writer)
Multiple Maniacs (1970) as Mr. David (also: production assistant)
Pink Flamingos (1972) as Raymond Marble (also: hair stylist, uncredited)
Female Trouble (1974) as Donald Dasher (also:hair stylist)
Divine Trash (1998) as Himself (archive footage)
In Bad Taste (2000) (TV) as Himself (archive footage)
I Am Divine (2013) as Himself (archive footage)

References

External links
 

1944 births
1977 deaths
20th-century American male actors
Accidental deaths in New York (state)
Deaths from bleeding
Drug-related deaths in New York City
American gay actors
LGBT people from Maryland
Male actors from Baltimore
20th-century American LGBT people